The singing cisticola (Cisticola cantans) is a species of bird in the family Cisticolidae.
It is found in Benin, Burkina Faso, Burundi, Cameroon, Central African Republic, Chad, Democratic Republic of the Congo, Ivory Coast, Eritrea, Ethiopia, Gambia, Ghana, Guinea, Guinea-Bissau, Kenya, Liberia, Malawi, Mali, Mozambique, Niger, Nigeria, Rwanda, Senegal, Sierra Leone, Sudan, Tanzania, Togo, Uganda, Zambia, and Zimbabwe.
Its natural habitats are subtropical or tropical dry forest and subtropical or tropical dry shrubland.

References

External links
 Singing cisticola - Species text in The Atlas of Southern African Birds.

singing cisticola
Birds of Sub-Saharan Africa
singing cisticola
Taxa named by Theodor von Heuglin
Taxonomy articles created by Polbot